Mohammad Ahmad Mohammad Al Murr Al Falasi (born 1955 in Dubai) is a short-story writer from the United Arab Emirates.

He has published over 15 volumes of short stories and has had two collections translated into English: Dubai Tales and The Wink of the Mona Lisa.

Al Murr graduated from Syracuse University in the United States, and has been a member of a number of UAE academic institutions and councils. He is the head of the Dubai Cultural Council, recently reorganized as the Dubai Culture & Arts Authority.

In 2011 Al Murr was appointed to the Federal National Council's 15th Chapter as a representative of the Emirate of Dubai, and elected uncontested as Speaker. He served as the speaker from 2011 to 2015.

References

External links
arabdecision.org
mini bio
banipal.co.uk

Speakers of the Federal National Council
1955 births
Living people
Emirati short story writers
People from Dubai
Maxwell School of Citizenship and Public Affairs alumni